The 1927 Giro di Lombardia was the 23rd edition of the Giro di Lombardia cycle race and was held on 30 October 1927. The race started and finished in Milan. The race was won by Alfredo Binda.

General classification

References

1927
Giro di Lombardia
Giro di Lombardia